The year 1993 was the 22nd year after the independence of Bangladesh. It was the third year of the first term of the government of Khaleda Zia.

Incumbents

 President: Abdur Rahman Biswas
 Prime Minister: Khaleda Zia
 Chief Justice: Shahabuddin Ahmed

Demography

Climate

Flood
 Beginning of August 1993, heavy floods hit the district of Gaibandha District in Northern Bangladesh.  Continuous rainfall followed. The flood water exceeded the highest level of the 2004 floods, affecting 47,000 households.

Economy

Note: For the year 1993 average official exchange rate for BDT was 39.57 per US$.

Events
 12 May – Bangladesh and Myanmar sign an MOU with UNHCR to facilitate repatriation of Rohingya refugees.
 22 May – India and Bangladesh signed an accord to facilitate repatriation of 50,000 Chakma refugees from India to Bangladesh.
 8 June – Securities and Exchange Commission (Bangladesh), the regulator of the capital market of Bangladesh, was established under the Securities and Exchange Commission Act, 1993.

Awards and Recognitions

Independence Day Award

Ekushey Padak
Moniruddin Yusuf (literature)
Rabeya Khatun (literature)
Mofazzal Haider Chaudhuri (education)
Riazuddin Ahmed (journalism)
Mohammad Asafuddowla (music)
Fazlul Huq (musician) (music)
Dilara Zaman (acting)
Rafiqun Nabi (fine arts)
Jewel Aich (magic arts)

Sports
 South Asian (Federation) Games:
 Bangladesh hosted the 1993 South Asian Federation Games in Dhaka from 20–27 December. With 11 golds, 19 silvers and 32 bronzes Bangladesh ended the tournament at the fourth position in overall points table.
 Domestic football:
 Mohammedan SC won Dhaka League title while Abahani KC became runner-up.

Births
 25 February – Soumya Sarkar, cricketer
 1 April – Jahanara Alam, cricketer
 15 May – Mohammad Mahfizur Rahman, swimmer
 25 October – Sabina Khatun, footballer
 3 December – Wahed Ahmed, footballer

Deaths
 16 March – A. N. M. Nuruzzaman, freedom fighter (b. 1938)
 17 October – Syed Mohammad Ali, journalist (b. 1928)

See also 
 1990s in Bangladesh
 List of Bangladeshi films of 1993
 Timeline of Bangladeshi history

References